is a Spanish UCI ProTeam road cycling team that was founded in 2020. The squad, run by the Asociación Deportiva Galibier, has a feeder team Lizarte, which has been competing in cycling since 1993.

The team was promoted from the UCI Continental level in 2021.

Team roster

Major results
2020
Stage 3 Belgrade Banjaluka, Enrique Sanz
2021
Stage 6 Volta ao Alentejo, Enrique Sanz
 Overall Tour Alsace, José Félix Parra
Stage 4, José Félix Parra

References

External links
 

UCI Professional Continental teams
Cycling teams based in Spain
Cycling teams established in 2020